The governor of Svalbard represents the Norwegian government in exercising its sovereignty over the Svalbard archipelago (Spitsbergen).

The position reports to the Norwegian Ministry of Justice, but it maintains all Norwegian interests in the area, including environmental protection, law enforcement, representation, mediation, and civil matters, such as marriage, divorce. An important part of the position is to maintain good working relations with the Russian community in Barentsburg.

To this end, the governor's organization consists of:
a staff section with Russian interpreters and advisors on legal matters, tourism, etc.
a section for law enforcement
a section for environmental protection
an administrative section, including archiving, financial management and IT support

The governor's office also has at its disposition several helicopters, snowmobiles, speedboats and other equipment needed to meet its responsibilities. The office's annual budget is determined by the Norwegian Storting, and runs at about NOK 60 million, of which the largest part is used for transportation.

List of governors of Svalbard (sysselmenn)

References

External links

Svalbard, Governor of
 
Politics of Svalbard
Svalbard
Organisations based in Longyearbyen
Government of the Arctic